James Small may refer to:

James Small (botanist) (1889–1955), Scottish botanist
James Small (Scottish factor) (died 1777), manager of forfeited estates
James Small (inventor) (1740–1793), Scottish inventor
James Small (rugby union) (1969-2019), South African rugby union footballer
James Small (Scottish laird) (1835–1900), laird of Dirnanean
James Edward Small (1798–1869), early Canadian judge and political figure
Jim Small (born 1933), Australian politician
Jim Small (baseball) (born 1937), American baseball player